Kirt Dean Manwaring (born July 15, 1965) is an American former professional baseball player. He played as a catcher in Major League Baseball from  through , most prominently as a member of the San Francisco Giants, with whom he played for the majority of his career. He also played for the Houston Astros and the Colorado Rockies.

Baseball career
Manwaring was selected by the Boston Red Sox in the 12th round of the 1983 free-agent draft but, did not sign. He was then selected by the San Francisco Giants in the second round of the 1986 draft out of Coastal Carolina University at the age of 21. A little over a year later, he made his major league debut with the Giants, then spent the next several years splitting time between the major and minor leagues.

Manwaring earned a Gold Glove Award in 1993. He finished the season with the National League's second-highest percentage of throwing out base stealers (45 percent). He spent a decade with the Giants, until they traded him to the Houston Astros for Rick Wilkins and cash, in July 1996. At the end of the season, he signed with the Colorado Rockies. He finished his last season in 1999. He is currently a catching instructor for the Giants.

Manwaring was a standout baseball player at Horseheads High School in Horseheads, New York.

Awards
A very good defensive catcher, he recorded a .998 fielding percentage and won a Gold Glove award with the San Francisco Giants in 1993. He won the 1993 Willie Mac Award honoring his spirit and leadership. In 1993, he was tied for 4th in intentional walks, with 13, all while batting 8th in front of the pitcher's spot.

Notes

References 

San Francisco Giants players
Houston Astros players
Colorado Rockies players
Gold Glove Award winners
Horseheads High School alumni
Major League Baseball catchers
Baseball players from New York (state)
Sportspeople from Elmira, New York
1965 births
Living people
Coastal Carolina Chanticleers baseball players
Clinton Giants players
Colorado Springs Sky Sox players
Phoenix Firebirds players
San Jose Giants players
Shreveport Captains players